The Santa Cruz Sentinel is a daily newspaper published in Santa Cruz, California, covering Santa Cruz County, California, and owned by Media News Group.

Ottaway Community Newspapers, a division of Dow Jones & Company bought the paper in 1982 from the McPherson family. Community Newspaper Holdings bought the Sentinel in late 2006 from Ottaway, but quickly sold it, February 2, 2007, to MediaNews Group. The MediaNews Group formed Digital First Media in 2013 when it merged with Journal Register Company. The company is controlled by the hedge fund Alden Global Capital.

Staff 
 Publisher/Editor:Jim Gleim 
 Director of Operations and Advertising: Steve Bennett
 Managing Editor: Melissa Murphy

References

External links 

 Sentinel Website
 Official mobile site 

Daily newspapers published in California
Companies based in Santa Cruz County, California